Rabbi Zag de Sujurmenza was a Jewish convert of 13th-century Spain who helped King Alfonso X of Castile with his scientific works.

Zag de Sujurmenza was commissioned by the king to write Astrolabio redondo (spherical astrolabe), Astrolabio llano (flat astrolabe), Constelaciones (constellations) and Lámina Universal (an instrument that improved on the astrolabe); he also translated the book Armellas de Ptolemy,  and wrote about the Piedra de la sombra (stone of the shadow, or sundial), Relox de agua (clepsydra, or water clock) Argente vivo o azogue (quicksilver or mercury) and Candela (candle clock). Of his works, the most important are those of the "round astrolabe" and the "flat astrolabe". In the first, the author rises to profound scientific considerations that reveal the vast knowledge he possessed in sciences. It has been said that with this book, Zag Sujurmenza reformed the character of the science of astronomy and contributed to its advancement, without losing sight of the studies of Arab scholars, following in their footsteps and correcting their errors. Other works of Zag de Sujurmenza, if less extensive, are not without merit.

See also 
Toledo School of Translators
Literature of Alfonso X
Book of knowledge of astrology
History of sundials
Libros del saber de astronomía [The Books of the Wisdom of Astronomy by King Alfonso X, the Learned]

External links
 Los Libros de los relojes de Alfonso X el Sabio [Books of the Clocks of Alfonso the Wise]
 "Las ciencias exactas y físico-naturales", by Julio Samsó ("The court of Spain in the 13th century", "scientific works of Alfonso X: translations and original works"...)
 Los Astrolabios y los Nocturlabios: Los primeros utensilios portátiles para medir la posición y el tiempo. (images from Libros del saber de astronomía [Books of wisdom of astronomy of King Alfonso X the Wise] of Alfonso X el Sabio 13th century and various 13th-century astrolabes.)

References
Rodriguez de Castro, Spanish Library

The content of this article incorporates material of Volume 70 of the Enciclopedia universal ilustrada europeo-americana (Espasa) with copyright before 1932, which is in the public domain.

Converts to Roman Catholicism from Judaism
Spanish Jews
Spanish Roman Catholics
Spanish translators
13th-century translators
13th-century astronomers
Medieval Spanish astronomers
Medieval Jewish astronomers